Pietro Paolo Medici (died 1657) was a Roman Catholic prelate who served as Bishop of Alife (1639–1657).

Biography
On 11 April 1639, Pietro Paolo Medici was appointed during the papacy of Pope Urban VIII as Bishop of Alife.
On 25 April 1639, he was consecrated bishop by Alessandro Cesarini (iuniore), Cardinal-Deacon of Sant'Eustachio, with Tommaso Carafa, Bishop Emeritus of Vulturara e Montecorvino, and Lorenzo della Robbia, Bishop of Fiesole, serving as co-consecrators. 
He served as Bishop of Alife until his death in or October 1656 or October 1657.

References

External links and additional sources
 (for Chronology of Bishops) 
 (for Chronology of Bishops) 

17th-century Italian Roman Catholic bishops
Bishops appointed by Pope Urban VIII
1657 deaths